Rachel Lee Goldenberg (born 1984/1985) is an American film director and screenwriter. She has directed a number of feature films and television episodes. She had her breakthrough after she was discovered by Will Ferrell, who gave her the opportunity to direct the Lifetime television film A Deadly Adoption, in which he starred.

Her 1980s musical film Valley Girl was released in May 2020. She has also directed films made by The Asylum. In addition she directed web shorts for Funny or Die, including the series Lady Time. Her next film, Unpregnant, premiered on September 10, 2020, on HBO Max.

Early life 
In 2003, Goldenberg graduated from Algoquin Regional High School in Northboro, Massachusetts. She then attended Ithaca College where she obtained her B.S. in cinema and photography.

Career 
After graduating from college, Goldenberg moved to Los Angeles where she worked at the B movie production company The Asylum. She soon was given the opportunity to direct various films. Then she began directing and producing  for Funny or Die, a website launched by actor Will Ferrell and screenwriter Adam McKay. As part of her stint at Funny or Die, she served as the White House liaison during the Barack Obama administration. In 2014, she won the Primetime Emmy Award for Outstanding Short-Format Live-Action Entertainment Program for producing the Obama episode of the series Between Two Ferns with Zach Galifianakis.

Will Ferrell and Andrew Steele became interested in her unusual resume of both comedy and Lifetime movies, and hired her to direct Ferrell and Kristen Wiig in the Lifetime television film A Deadly Adoption.

Filmography

Films

Direct-to-video

Television
TV movies
 Love at the Christmas Table (2012)
 Escape From Polygamy (2014)
 A Deadly Adoption (2015)
 Playing Dead (2018)

TV series

References

External links
 
 Princess and the Pony at The Asylum
 Sherlock Holmes at The Asylum
 Official website

American women film directors
Living people
Year of birth missing (living people)
Ithaca College alumni
21st-century American women